Rasm Al-Nafl is a Syrian village located in the countryside of Aleppo city, Aleppo Governorate, As-Safira District.  

According to the 2004 Syrian Census the population of the village was 1,601 . 

Pro-rebel activists, during the Syrian Civil War,  claimed that 208 civilians were killed in Rasm Al-Nafl village, they accused the Syrian government, Lebanese Hezbollah and Liwa Abu al-Fadhal al-Abbas who allegedly broke into the village on 22 June 2013.

References 

 http://www.suriyehaberajansi.com/hizbullahin-rasm-al-nafl-katliami-191-sivil-vahsice-katledildi--181h.htm
 https://sn4hr.org/public_html/wp-content/pdf/english/shia'a-en.pdf

Populated places in al-Safira District